Mary Hunt Affleck (January 20, 1847 – November 28, 1932) was an American agrarian poet from Texas and a Confederate advocate.

Early life
Mary Hunt was born on January 20, 1847, in Danville, Kentucky. Her father was James Anderson Hunt and her mother, Anna (Adair) Hunt. She graduated from Harrodsburg Female College in Harrodsburg, Kentucky. She moved to Burleson County, Texas in 1874.

Career
She worked as a poet, focusing on agrarian themes. Her poems were widely published in Texas newspapers.

She was a member of the Daughters of the American Revolution, the United Daughters of the Confederacy, the United States Daughters of 1812, and the Texas Editorial Association. She served as chairwoman of the textbook committee for the Texas division of the United Daughters of the Confederacy. In this role, she encouraged other members to focus on selecting schoolbooks highlighting Southern values and painting a balanced picture of the Civil War. In 1910, she gave a speech at the dedication of a Confederate monument in honor of Hood's Texas Brigade in Austin, Texas.

Personal life and death
She married Isaac Dunbar Affleck (1844–1919), the son of planter Thomas Affleck (1812–1868). They had three children. They lived in Washington County, Texas.

Affleck died on November 28, 1932, in Galveston, Texas.

References

1847 births
1932 deaths
Writers from Danville, Kentucky
People from Washington County, Texas
Poets from Texas
19th-century American poets
20th-century American poets
American women poets
20th-century American women writers
19th-century American women writers
Kentucky women writers
People from Burleson County, Texas